Redding–Hill House, also known as Hill Homestead and House of Seven Hills, is a historic home located at Keytesville, Chariton County, Missouri. The original section was built in 1832, as a simple rectangular one story frame house. Additions to the building occurred over a period of about 44 years to about 1876 to become a rambling, ten room, wood-frame structure and is considered "an architectural curiosity."

It was listed on the National Register of Historic Places in 1969.

References

Houses on the National Register of Historic Places in Missouri
Houses completed in 1832
Buildings and structures in Chariton County, Missouri
National Register of Historic Places in Chariton County, Missouri